Around the World in 80 Gardens is a television series of 10 programmes in which British gardener and broadcaster Monty Don visits 80 of the world's most celebrated gardens. The series was filmed over a period of 18 months and was first broadcast on BBC Two at 9.00pm on successive Sundays from 27 January to 30 March 2008. A book based on the series was also published.
 
The title of the series was a reference to Jules Verne's novel Around the World in Eighty Days.

Mexico & Cuba

Australia & New Zealand
Starting with Botany Bay...

India

In addition to the Old Railway Garden, Don also featured the surrounding "tea gardens" (tea plantations). He expressly did not count it as one out of the eighty, however.

South America

United States of America

China & Japan

The Mediterranean

South Africa

Northern Europe

South East Asia

References and Notes
 a.Revisited in Monty Don's American Gardens
 i.Revisited in Monty Don's Italian Gardens
 p.Revisited in Monty Don's Paradise Gardens

See also
 Monty Don's Italian Gardens
 Monty Don's French Gardens
 Monty Don's Paradise Gardens

External links
 
Review in The Daily Telegraph, 26 January 2008
 

2008 British television series debuts
2008 British television series endings
2000s British documentary television series
BBC television documentaries
Gardening lists
Gardens
Gardening television
Garden design history
Gardening in the United Kingdom
2000s British travel television series
Television episodes set in Mexico
Television episodes set in Cuba
Television episodes set in Australia
Television episodes set in New Zealand
Television episodes set in Brazil
Television episodes set in Argentina
Television episodes set in Chile
Television episodes set in the United States
Television episodes set in China
Television episodes set in Japan
Television episodes set in Belgium
Television episodes set in the Netherlands
Television episodes set in France
Television episodes set in Italy
Television episodes set in Morocco
Television episodes set in Spain
Television episodes set in South Africa
Television episodes set in Thailand
Television episodes set in Singapore
Television episodes set in Indonesia
Japan in non-Japanese culture